Vasai Creek, previously Bassein Creek, is an estuary and one of the two main distributaries of the Ulhas River, in Konkan division of Maharashtra, India. The Ulhas splits at the northeast corner of Salsette island into its two main distributaries, the other one being the Thane Creek, both of which empty west into the Arabian Sea at the Bombay Harbour. 

The creek forms the northern boundary of Salsette island and separates the island from mainland of Konkan, on which lie the twin cities of Vasai-Virar. The creek separates the northern most part   from.

To the south of the creek lies Bhayandar suburb of Mumbai (Bombay) district& to the north of the creek lies  Naigaon in Vasai (Bassein). Two rail bridges pass through Panju Island which lies in between the satellite cities of Vasai-Virar and Mumbai (Bombay). The old railway crossing bridge was supposedly built in British Bombay, and has been closed since it was declared too dangerous to cross. The two new bridges are functional and has 4 tracks, 2 on each bridge. The Bhayander side of the creek has a lot of outdoor activities and recreational areas which includes joggers park, playground, puja area and visarjan area for idol immersion on the east side. On the west side there are small garden benches. There are also small paths heading down into the sea where the waves can be watched hitting the shoreline.

Transport 
The areas around the Vasai Creek have been developing at high pace. To accommodate the growing demand of transport, the Creek is being looked forward to be used as a waterway to boost inland water and cargo transport. The Maharashtra Maritime Board (MMB) is developing coastal shipping facilities at 5 points in the Vasai Creek. The 5 points under consideration are Bhayandar, Gaimukh, Kolshet, Majiwada and Kalher.

Gallery

References

Estuaries of Mumbai
Geography of Thane district